This is a list of the National Register of Historic Places listings in Comal County, Texas.

This is intended to be a complete list of properties and districts listed on the National Register of Historic Places in Comal County, Texas. There are three districts and 26 individual properties listed on the National Register in the county. One property is located within a National Natural Landmark. Ten individually listed properties comprise 11 Recorded Texas Historic Landmarks including one that is also designated a State Antiquities Landmark. Two districts contain several more Recorded Texas Historic Landmarks.

Current listings

The publicly disclosed locations of National Register properties and districts may be seen in a mapping service provided.

|}

See also

National Register of Historic Places listings in Texas
Recorded Texas Historic Landmarks in Comal County

References

External links

Registered Historic Places
Comal County
Buildings and structures in Comal County, Texas